Chukwuebuka Vincent Onovo (born 10 December 1995) is a Nigerian footballer who plays for Újpest FC as a midfielder.

Career

Club
On 26 October 2015, HJK announced the signing of Onovo on a two-year contract.

On 19 February 2018, Onovo signed for Hungarian side Újpest FC as a free agent. After a few seasons at Újpest, Onovo joined Danish Superliga club Randers FC on 17 August 2021, signing a deal until the end of 2024. In the search of more playing time, Onovo returned to his former club Újpest FC, on a loan deal for the rest of the season from Randers. On 6 June 2022, Randers confirmed that Onovo had signed Újpest permanently.

Career statistics

Club

References

External links
Veikkausliiga
HJK Helsinki sign Onovo

1995 births
Living people
People from Abuja
Nigerian footballers
Association football midfielders
FC Inter Turku players
Helsingin Jalkapalloklubi players
Randers FC players
Újpest FC players
Veikkausliiga players
Nemzeti Bajnokság I players
Danish Superliga players
Nigerian expatriate footballers
Nigerian expatriate sportspeople in Finland
Nigerian expatriate sportspeople in Hungary
Nigerian expatriate sportspeople in Denmark
Expatriate footballers in Finland
Expatriate footballers in Hungary
Expatriate men's footballers in Denmark